East Garrison is an unincorporated community in Monterey County, California. It is located on Reservation Road (County Route G17) east of Marina and west of the Salinas River on the former Fort Ord. A community services district for East Garrison was developed in 2005. East Garrison is part of Monterey County's Fourth District and is represented by Supervisor Wendy Root Askew as of January 5, 2021.

Redevelopment of the area, as a planned community, is well underway.  As of January 2022, construction of 1,400 single family homes and over half of the planned 420 affordable housing units is complete as well as the Monterey Regional Fire station and 6.8 acre Lincoln Park and 29.4 acres of open space.

Planned, but not yet started, is construction of the mixed-use Town Center.  and live/work rentals for artists and the conversion of historic buildings into 55,000 sq. ft of artist studios.

The construction schedule of the Town Center, a critical element of the community, has fallen behind due to the COVID-19 Pandemic.

"At least 20,000 square feet of retail use space in the mixed-use Town Center must be built by the time the 200th lot in the third phase is sold. And, all 34,000 sq. ft of retail space must be built by 2025. In addition to retail, the Town Center is required to include a new library and Sheriff’s field office, as well as a one-acre park.

The Arts Historic District plan to renovate and convert 23 historic World War II-era buildings for use by Artspace, Inc. as 100,000 square feet of affordable art studio space has also not started yet. As the last funding priority in the East Garrison development agreement, the district will wait until after the affordable apartment complexes are fully funded."

Manzanita Place, an affordable-housing apartment complex of 66 units managed by MidPen Housing was built in Phase 1. Community Housing Improvement Systems and Planning Association (CHISPA) will soon construct another 66 units of affordable housing in the Phase 3 section of East Garrison.

External links
 East Garrison Community Website

References

Unincorporated communities in California
Unincorporated communities in Monterey County, California